The Quitabaquito tryonia, scientific name Tryonia quitobaquitae,  is a species of small freshwater snail with a gill and an operculum, an aquatic gastropod mollusk in the family Hydrobiidae. This species is endemic to the United States.

The common name refers to the Quitabaquito Springs Oasis, in Organ Pipe Cactus National Monument, Arizona.

References

Endemic fauna of the United States
Tryonia
Gastropods described in 1988
Taxonomy articles created by Polbot